The Jewish apocrypha are books written in large part by Jews, especially during the Second Temple period, not accepted as sacred manuscripts when the Hebrew Bible was canonized. Some of these books are considered sacred by most Christians, and are included in their versions of the Old Testament. The Jewish apocrypha is distinctive from the New Testament apocrypha and biblical apocrypha as it is the only one of these collections which works within a Jewish theological framework.

Apocrypha in Judaism 
Certain circles in Judaism, such as the Essenes in Judea and the Therapeutae in Egypt, were said to have a "secret" literature (see Dead Sea scrolls). The Pharisees were also familiar with these texts. A large part of this "secret" literature was the apocalypses. Based on unfulfilled prophecies, these books were not considered scripture, but rather part of a literary form that flourished from 200 BCE to 100 CE. These works usually bore the names of ancient Hebrew worthies to establish their validity among the true writers' contemporaries. This literature was highly treasured by many Jewish enthusiasts.

4 Ezra reinforces this theory: when Ezra was inspired to dictate the sacred scriptures that were destroyed in the overthrow of Jerusalem, 

Writings that were wholly apart from scriptural texts were designated as Hitsonim (literally: external) by the Sanhedrin and reading them was forbidden. In the following centuries, these apocrypha fell out of use in Judaism.

Books

In the Torah 
 Genesis Apocryphon (מגילה חיצונית לבראשית)
 Life of Adam and Eve (ספר אדם וחוה)
 Testament of Qahat (צוואת קהת)
 Visions of Amram (חזון עמרם)
 Book of Jubilees (ספר היובלים)
 1 Enoch ('ספר חנוך א)
 2 Enoch ('ספר חנוך ב)
 3 Enoch ('ספר חנוך ג)
 Testaments of the Twelve Patriarchs (צוואות השבטים)
 Testament of Abraham (צוואת אברהם)
 Apocalypse of Abraham (חזון אחרית הימים של אברהם)
 Assumption of Moses (עליית משה)
 Joseph and Aseneth (יוסף ואסנת)

In Nevi'im 

 Book of Gad the Seer (דברי גד החוזה)
 Book of Wisdom (חכמת שלמה)
 Psalms of Solomon (מזמורי שלמה)
 Letter of Jeremiah (איגרת ירמיהו)
 Ascension of Isaiah (עליית ישעיהו)
 1 Baruch (ספר ברוך)
 2 Baruch ('חזון ברוך א)
 3 Baruch ('חזון ברוך ב)

In Ketuvim 

 Testament of Job (דברי איוב)
 1 Esdras (עזרא החיצוני)
 2 Esdras (חזון עזרא)
 Psalm 151 (מזמור קנ"א)
 Psalms 152–155 (מזמורי קנ"ב–קנ"ה)
 Additions to the Book of Esther (תוספות למגילת אסתר)
 Additions to Daniel (תוספות לספר דניאל)
 Prayer of Manasseh (תפילת מנשה)

Other apocrypha 

 Sirach (בן סירא)
 Book of Judith (ספר יהודית)
 Book of Tobit (ספר טוביה)
 1 Maccabees ('ספר מכבים א)
 2 Maccabees (ספר מכבים ב׳)
 3 Maccabees (ספר מכבים ג׳)
 4 Maccabees (ספר מכבים ד׳)
 Letter of Aristeas (איגרת אריסטיאס)
 Sibylline Oracles (חזיונות הסיבילות)
 Liber Antiquitatum Biblicarum (קדמוניות המקרא)

References

 

 
Apocrypha
Apocrypha
Second Temple period